Xoxocotla may refer to:
 Xoxocotla, Morelos, a municipality, or its municipal seat of the same name
 Xoxocotla, Veracruz, a municipality, or its municipal seat of the same name